Somokluy-e Sofla (also Romanized as Somoklūy-e Soflá; also known as Somoklū, Somoklū-ye Soflá, and Sūmīlkū) is a village in Anjirlu Rural District, in the Central District of Bileh Savar County, Ardabil Province, Iran. At the 2006 census, its population was 83, in 20 families.

References 

Populated places in Bileh Savar County
Towns and villages in Bileh Savar County